Nethertown is a small village in Cumbria, England on the Irish Sea coast.

The community is covered by the civil parish of "Lowside Quarter", and was created out of one of the old parochial townships of the parish of St Bees.

History
During WW2 an anti-aircraft training camp was established, which later became the contractor camp housing workers building the Sellafield Nuclear plant from the late 1940s to early 1950s. Following the departure of the contractors, the canteen was converted into the "Tow Bar Inn" - a well patronised dance venue. This was closed in the 1980s and the site is now a private residential estate.

The village had its own school, which later became a mission church for St Bees Priory. It is now a private residence.

The community today is predominantly residential and agricultural.

Transport links
It is served by Nethertown railway station which is spectacularly sited on a short cliff above the Irish Sea coast.

Gallery

References

"100 Years of St Bees", Douglas Sim. 1995,

Video
video of mainline class 37 at 60 mph through Nethertown.

Villages in Cumbria
Borough of Copeland